Akoko North-East is a Local Government Area in Ondo State, Nigeria. Its headquarters is in the town of Ikare. Ikare consist of 15 districts or towns, namely:                          Okela, Okorun, Eshe, Odo, Ilepa, Okoja, Iku, Odeyare, Odoruwa, Okeruwa, Iyame, Igbede, Oyinmo, Ishakunmi, and Ekan.

It has an area of 372 km and a population of 175,409 at the 2006 census.

The postal code of the area is 342.

It is a developing area with numerous firms sited there such as

1ST TOP Fashion and style Boutique . Address: Hospital Rd, 340283, Akure, Ondo

Access bank Plc.

Address: Adekunle Ajasin University, Akungba Akoko, Ondo State.

Ayo and Layo Nigeria Ltd                                 Address: 21, Funmilayo Street, Ikare, Akoko North-East, Ondo, Nigeria

Blessoria and Company                                     Address: Omiatan Petrol Station Ikare Akoko Akoko North-East Ondo Nigeria

Bliss World Resorts and Hotels Big Hall Address: Akure, Ondo

Bonki Fashion & Bridal                             Address: Opposite Tipper Garage, Along Ondo Road, 340110, Akure, Ondo

Bonire And Sons Company                            Address: Lokoja Road Akoko North East Ondo Nigeria

Chris Rose Company                                    Address: L/27, Ilepa Street, Ikare Akoko, Akoko North East, Ondo, Nigeria

Dollarpee Fishery                                           Address: Deeper Life Bible Church - Camp Ground, North Gate, Along, Akure.

Gabjoy Nig. Company                                   Address: Ado Ogbagi Road Ikare Akoko North-East Ondo Nigeria

Ideal Itesiwaju Company

Address: Shop 33, Ori Oke Complex, Akungba-Akoko, Akoko North East, Ondo, Nigeria

References

Local Government Areas in Ondo State